Castrovirreyna is a town in central Peru, capital of Castrovirreyna Province in Huancavelica Region.

Populated places in the Huancavelica Region